Angus Brayshaw (born 9 January 1996) is a professional Australian rules footballer playing for the Melbourne Football Club in the Australian Football League (AFL). He has strong family connections in Australian sport, with his father, Mark Brayshaw, a former  player and the current AFL Coaches' Association Chief Executive Officer; his uncle James Brayshaw a former state cricketer, former North Melbourne chairman, and a sports media personality; and his paternal grandfather, Ian Brayshaw, a former state cricketer and footballer with the Claremont Football Club.

Brayshaw played top-level football early when he played in the TAC Cup for the Sandringham Dragons as a bottom-aged player, in addition to representing Victoria at under-16 level, and continued to represent the state which culminated in selection for Vic Metro in the 2014 AFL Under 18 Championships. His achievements at junior level included the most valuable player award at state level, the best-on-ground academy player, and selection in the All-Australian team and TAC Cup team of the year. He was recruited by Melbourne with the third overall selection in the 2014 AFL draft and he made his debut during the 2015 season, resulting in a fifth-place finish in the AFL Rising Star award.

Early life
Brayshaw was born to Mark and Debra Brayshaw in Western Australia. He was born into a sporting family with his paternal grandfather, Ian, representing Western Australia in cricket and is a premiership player with Western Australian Football League club Claremont. His uncle James played first-class cricket for Western Australia and South Australia, and his father played 32 matches for the North Melbourne Football Club.

Brayshaw attended Haileybury College and played his junior football with the Hampton Rovers Football Club. He was recognised as an elite talent at a young age when he received a scholarship with the Australian Institute of Sport through the AIS-AFL Academy as part of their level one squad in the 2012 intake. In the same year, he was selected to play with Vic Metro in the under-16 championships and was awarded the most valuable player for Vic Metro.

He played five matches as a bottom-aged player in the TAC Cup for the Sandringham Dragons in 2013 and after being ineligible for the 2013 AFL draft by missing the age cut-off date by nine days, Brayshaw spent 2014 competing in junior competitions and studying a double degree in commerce and engineering at Monash University. He was selected as part of the level two squad in the 2013 intake for the AIS-AFL Academy and travelled to Europe for two weeks in April 2014 with a 31-man squad. At the start of the tour, Brayshaw was awarded the MCC Chairman's Medal as the best academy player after competing in a match against 's Victorian Football League (VFL) side at the Melbourne Cricket Ground.

Playing for the Sandringham Dragons in the TAC Cup in 2014, Brayshaw was regarded as one of the top draft prospects for the 2014 AFL draft and was appointed captain of Sandringham. He earned mid-year state honours through selection for Vic Metro in the Under 18 Championships and was rewarded with All-Australian selection as a half-back flanker. In addition, his efforts in the TAC Cup saw him secure a spot in the team of the year as a ruck-rover.

Brayshaw was highly rated among recruiters in his final junior year and was likened to  captain, Joel Selwood, for his "fearless attack on the ball", he was also rated as a potential number one draft pick by AFL national talent manager, Kevin Sheehan. He was appraised as the player who would have the biggest impact in their first season due to his body size and natural leadership.

AFL career

Brayshaw was linked to the Melbourne Football Club in the weeks leading to the draft and was ultimately recruited by the club with their second selection and third overall in the 2014 national draft. He was predicted to make a Round 1 debut after strong performances with Melbourne's affiliate team, the Casey Scorpions, in Victorian Football League (VFL) practice matches despite not featuring for Melbourne in the NAB Challenge. He debuted in the 26-point win against  at the Melbourne Cricket Ground in Round 1 and laid a match-high nine tackles before being substituted off in the fourth quarter. After a string of consistent performances, he was awarded the Round 10 nomination for the Rising Star for his efforts in the annual Queen's Birthday Clash against , in which he recorded eighteen disposals, six tackles, seven inside-50s, four goal assists, and a goal. His performance was praised by former Melbourne captain Garry Lyon, and he predicted that Brayshaw would be a "200-gamer and leader of the Demons."

Brayshaw missed only one match during his debut season due to being rested against  at Domain Stadium in Round 22. His season was acclaimed within the AFL industry, particularly his mid-season form, where his tenacity and desperation around the ball was highlighted with comparisons to Joel Selwood, in addition to former  captain, Jonathan Brown, commending his toughness. He was noted as an equal favourite for the Rising Star, alongside  midfielder Patrick Cripps, by Herald Sun chief football writer, Mark Robinson, after his performance against  in Round 12. He ultimately finished fifth in the award after a drop in form in the second half of the season. He was recognised among his peers by finishing second in the AFL Players Association best first year player award, behind  midfielder, Isaac Heeney; furthermore, he finished eleventh in Melbourne's best and fairest count.

Brayshaw was highly rated by the AFL players heading into the 2016 season, whereby he was named the second-best player in the league recruited from the 2014 and 2015 drafts. In the opening match of the 2016 NAB Challenge against , he injured his knee five seconds into the match after a tackle from Port Adelaide midfielder Hamish Hartlett, and the injury forced him to miss the remainder of the pre-season competition. In a bid to play in the Round 1 match against , he played for Casey in a VFL practice match, where he recorded 17 disposals and a goal. He ultimately missed the Round 1 win against Greater Western Sydney and played his first AFL match for the season in Round 2 in the 13-point loss against  at the Melbourne Cricket Ground, where he recorded nine disposals. He was omitted the next week for the match against  at Blundstone Arena due to looking "tired".

The same weekend in the VFL match against , he sustained a concussion after a football kicked by teammate, Alex Neal-Bullen, hit him in the back of the head. Two weeks later, he suffered a second concussion when he had a head clash in the VFL match against  and he was placed on the sidelines for an "extended period of time". He played his first match in four weeks when he played for Casey against , where he accumulated twenty-nine disposals and kicked two goals. He returned to the senior side in the thirty-six point loss against  at Etihad Stadium in Round 17 in which he recorded twenty-three disposals and seven clearances. He played the remainder of the season and finished with ten matches in total for the season, which saw him fall to twenty-third in Melbourne's best and fairest count.

Brayshaw had a reduced workload in the 2017 pre-season after injuring his calf in January and played the first two matches of the AFL season before he was omitted from the senior side for the Round 3 match against Geelong at Etihad Stadium. AFL Media reporter, Ben Guthrie, noted the calf injury was a key reason for his slow start to the season and he was yet to live up to his potential due to persistent injuries throughout his early career. Former Melbourne coach, Paul Roos, noted that although the public hadn't seen Brayshaw's best yet, he was Melbourne's most exciting prospect for 2017. In late April playing in the VFL, he received his third concussion in twelve months after receiving a bump from North Ballarat player, Hayden Walters. There were suggestions by the media that the multiple concussions in a short period of time would prematurely end his AFL career, however, these claims were quickly dismissed by Melbourne with head of football, Josh Mahoney, saying it was only a minor concussion.

With the club saying they would "map out a plan" to ensure he could play consistent football without the risk of concussion, reports emerged that the club had granted him indefinite leave to recover from his fourth concussion in twelve months. He was training two days after the reports emerged, with senior coach, Simon Goodwin, stating the reports of indefinite leave were inaccurate but Brayshaw would not return to playing for a while. He missed nine weeks of football before returning in the VFL Round 14 match against , wearing a helmet after receiving advice from former St Kilda player Nathan Burke, who received multiple bumps during his career. He returned to the AFL for the twenty-four point win against St Kilda in Round 21 at the Melbourne Cricket Ground; in the first quarter, he received a heavy bump from Koby Stevens; however, he was uninjured from the collision. Former player and a commentator during the match, Jason Dunstall, noted all the commentators were worried straight after the bump, but Brayshaw recovered and "used the ball well and made good decisions. [Dunstall] thought it was a fantastic fight back from when we had our heart in our mouths" and he was named in Melbourne's best players by AFL Media, the Herald Sun and The Age. He played the remainder of the season and finished with five AFL matches.

Brayshaw'a performances during the 2018 AFL season showed the competition what he is capable of, averaging a career high 26.1 disposals and kicking 14 goals for the season, with the Demons having vastly improved season, eventually making the preliminary final.
Brayshaw's 2018 season was highlighted with a 37-disposal, 3-goal game against the Adelaide Crows in Round 10 as well as a career-high of 39 disposals and a goal the next week. His season was capped off with a 3rd-place finish in the 2018 Brownlow medal, polling 21 votes.

Statistics
Updated to the end of the 2022 season.

|-
| 2015 ||  || 10
| 21 || 5 || 3 || 170 || 97 || 267 || 54 || 99 || 0.2 || 0.1 || 8.1 || 4.6 || 12.7 || 2.6 || 4.7 || 0
|-
| 2016 ||  || 10
| 10 || 7 || 2 || 83 || 93 || 176 || 30 || 42 || 0.7 || 0.2 || 8.3 || 9.3 || 17.6 || 3.0 || 4.2 || 0
|-
| 2017 ||  || 10
| 5 || 2 || 1 || 53 || 42 || 95 || 28 || 12 || 0.4 || 0.2 || 10.6 || 8.4 || 19.0 || 5.6 || 2.4 || 0
|-
| 2018 ||  || 10
| 22 || 14 || 10 || 322 || 252 || 574 || 108 || 99 || 0.6 || 0.5 || 14.6 || 11.5 || 26.1 || 4.9 || 4.5 || 21
|-
| 2019 ||  || 10
| 22 || 9 || 7 || 278 || 209 || 487 || 87 || 96 || 0.4 || 0.3 || 12.6 || 9.5 || 22.1 || 4.0 || 4.4 || 0
|-
| 2020 ||  || 10
| 14 || 5 || 6 || 116 || 117 || 233 || 40 || 41 || 0.4 || 0.4 || 8.3 || 8.4 || 16.6 || 2.9 || 2.9 || 1
|-
| scope=row bgcolor=F0E68C | 2021# ||  || 10
| 25 || 3 || 7 || 274 || 186 || 460 || 105 || 61 || 0.1 || 0.3 || 11.0 || 7.4 || 18.4 || 4.2 || 2.4 || 0
|-
| 2022 ||  || 10
| 24 || 2 || 1 || 401 || 211 || 612 || 170 || 54 || 0.1 || 0.0 || 16.7 || 8.8 || 25.5 || 7.1 || 2.3 || 7
|- class=sortbottom
! colspan=3 | Career
! 143 !! 47 !! 37 !! 1697 !! 1207 !! 2904 !! 622 !! 504 !! 0.3 !! 0.3 !! 11.9 !! 8.4 !! 20.3 !! 4.3 !! 3.5 !! 29
|}

Notes

Honours and achievements
Team
 AFL premiership player: 2021
 McClelland Trophy: 2021

Individual
 22under22 team: 2018
 AFL Rising Star nominee: 2015 (Round 10)

References

External links

Angus Brayshaw's profile from Demonwiki

1996 births
Living people
Melbourne Football Club players
Sandringham Dragons players
Australian rules footballers from Victoria (Australia)
People educated at Haileybury (Melbourne)
Casey Demons players
Melbourne Football Club Premiership players
One-time VFL/AFL Premiership players